Eureka is an unincorporated community in Pleasants County, West Virginia, United States. Eureka had a post office, which closed on January 16, 1993.

The community was named Eureka after oil was discovered in the area.

References

Unincorporated communities in Pleasants County, West Virginia
Unincorporated communities in West Virginia
West Virginia populated places on the Ohio River